Saint John's Cavalier is a 16th-century cavalier in Valletta, Malta, which was built by the Order of St. John. It overlooks St. John's Bastion, a large obtuse-angled bastion forming part of the Valletta Land Front. St. John was one of nine planned cavaliers in the city, although eventually only two were built, the other one being the identical Saint James Cavalier. It was designed by the Italian military engineer Francesco Laparelli, while its construction was overseen by his Maltese assistant Girolamo Cassar.

The cavalier is located close to the City Gate Arcade and Hastings Gardens. Today, the cavalier is the embassy of the Sovereign Military Order of Malta, the successor of the Order who built it in the first place.

History
Following the Great Siege of Malta of 1565, in which the Ottoman Empire attempted to take over Malta but failed to do so, the Order of St. John decided to settle permanently on the island. The Order decided to build a new fortified city as their new capital, and it was called Valletta after Grand Master Jean Parisot de Valette. In order to do this, De Valette asked for financial aid from various European rulers. Pope Pius V not only helped out financially, but he also sent the Italian military engineer Francesco Laparelli to Malta in order to design the new capital's fortifications. Construction of the city began in March 1566, and work continued throughout the 1570s. Following Laparelli's departure from Malta and his subsequent death, construction of the city was entrusted to his Maltese assistant, the architect and military engineer Girolamo Cassar.

St. John's Cavalier was one of the first buildings to be built in Valletta, along with the Church of Our Lady of Victories and the rest of the fortifications. The cavalier was built as a raised platform on which guns were placed to defend the city against attacks from the landward side, in the area were the town of Floriana was later built. As well as prohibiting entry, St. John's could also threaten those who had already breached the city's defences. It was linked to Saint James Cavalier by a now-blocked underground passageway.

In 1646, Grand Master Giovanni Paolo Lascaris grafted a number of warehouses for the storage of gunpowder and muskets on the flank and gorge of the cavalier. The warehouses were demolished in the late 1950s, and the commemorative inscription which was located on their façade is now affixed on the wall of the cavalier.

The cavalier was used by British forces during World War II.

Embassy

In 1967, the Government of Malta leased the cavalier to the Sovereign Military Order of Malta, the successor of the Order of St. John, for 99 years. The SMOM established its embassy in Malta there, and it was restored under the direction of ambassador Dino Marrajeni, and the Maltese engineer Roger de Giorgio, an expert on restoration of historical buildings. Within two years restoration was complete, and while modern alterations were made, care was taken to preserve all the original features of the building. An unobtrusive penthouse was built on the cavalier's roof as the residence of the Head of the Mission, and from it one can see an excellent view of the city below as well as the surrounding towns and villages.

The incumbent ambassador is HE Ing. Umberto Di Capua.

The cavalier is scheduled as a Grade 1 national monument, and it is also listed on the National Inventory of the Cultural Property of the Maltese Islands.

Architecture
St. John's Cavalier is a large casemated artillery platform having a pentagonal plan. The structure was not designed with aesthetics in mind, highlighting its purely utilitarian military function. Despite the impression of size given by the external aspect of the building, half of the structure was filled with compressed earth and the rest consisted of series of sparse chambers and a ramp by which cannons could reach the roof.

The cavalier occupies the rear face of St. John's Bastion, and it was meant to be able to fire over the bastion's main parapet, without interfering with its fire. Its terrace contains a gunpowder magazine.

A number of warehouses were grafted on the cavalier in the 17th century, but these were demolished in the 1950s.

Further reading

References

External links

National Inventory of the Cultural Property of the Maltese Islands

Buildings and structures in Valletta
Hospitaller fortifications in Malta
Limestone buildings in Malta
16th-century fortifications
Diplomatic missions of the Sovereign Military Order of Malta
Diplomatic missions in Malta
National Inventory of the Cultural Property of the Maltese Islands